Suparn Verma is an Indian writer and film director, who works in Hindi film industry. He has directed many films such as Ek Khiladi Ek Haseena, Acid Factory, and Aatma.

Career
Verma started his career as a journalist and. In 2005 he made his debut as a director with the film Ek Khiladi Ek Haseena. Then in 2009 he has directed Acid Factory, which didn't do well in the box office. And then in 2013 he made his directorial comeback with his third film Aatma.

Filmography

Films

Web series

References

External links 
 

20th-century Indian male writers
Male biographers
21st-century Indian film directors
Hindi-language film directors
Indian television directors
Living people
Indian screenwriters
Year of birth missing (living people)